Shirley Addison (née Webb) (born 28 September 1981) is a British former hammer thrower and performer in the Gladiators series as Battleaxe.

She was born in Whitley Bay, Tyne & Wear, England and is the daughter of Andrew Webb, a Scottish international hurdler who competed at the Commonwealth Games. She attended The King's School, Tynemouth and graduated from the University of Edinburgh with a degree in Mathematics.

Webb's own record of major championships includes Olympic Games (2004), World Championships, European Athletics Championships and two Commonwealth Games (2002, 2006) where she competed for Great Britain and Scotland respectively. In 2005, she won the European Cup for Great Britain.

Webb became a patron of Meningitis UK after suffering from viral meningitis.

International competitions

References

1981 births
Living people
People from Whitley Bay
Sportspeople from Tyne and Wear
British female hammer throwers
Scottish female hammer throwers
Olympic athletes of Great Britain
Gladiators (1992 British TV series)
Athletes (track and field) at the 2004 Summer Olympics
Commonwealth Games competitors for Scotland
Athletes (track and field) at the 2002 Commonwealth Games
Athletes (track and field) at the 2006 Commonwealth Games
World Athletics Championships athletes for Great Britain
People educated at The King's School, Tynemouth
Alumni of the University of Edinburgh
Competitors at the 2003 Summer Universiade